The Iso Varedo was a concept car produced by Italian car manufacturer Iso Autoveicoli S.p.A. in 1972 styled by Ercole Spada.  It was unveiled at the 1972 Turin Motor Show. Only one Varedo was ever built. It currently resides at the Sarasota Classic Car Museum in Florida.

Performance 
The Varedo is powered by a mid-mounted 351 cubic inch (5.7L) Ford 351 Cleveland V8 making . Power is driven to the rear wheels through a ZF 5-speed manual transmission. The Varedo also used a full fiberglass body in order to save weight.

References

Concept cars
Sports cars
Cars introduced in 1972
Rear mid-engine, rear-wheel-drive vehicles
Varedo